General Balfour may refer to:

James Balfour (British Army officer) (1743–1823), British Army general
Nisbet Balfour (1743—1823), British Army major general
Philip Balfour (1898–1977), British Army lieutenant general
Robert Balfour, 6th of Balbirnie (1772–1837), British Army lieutenant general
Thomas Graham Balfour (1813–1891), British Army surgeon general
William Balfour (general) (c. 1578–1660), Scottish-born English Civil War general